Marianne Viktoria Armgard Helene Doria Freifrau von Weizsäcker (née von Kretschmann; 17 May 1932) is the widow of Richard von Weizsäcker, the President of West Germany and reunited Germany from 1984 to 1994.

Early life 
Von Weizsacker was born Marianne Viktoria Armgard Helene Doria von Kretschmann on 17 May 1932 in Essen. Her mother, Asta, was the adopted daughter of prominent banker and industrialist .

Personal life 

Marianne and Richard von Weizsäcker were married from 1953 until his death on 31 January 2015. They have four children, including Robert K. von Weizsäcker, Professor of Economics. Two of her four children have predeceased her.

Her husband served as Governing Mayor of Berlin (West Berlin) from 1981 to 1984, when he was elected president. He was reelected for a second term in 1989.

Patronage  
During her husband's tenure, Marianne von Weizsäcker was the patron of several charitable organisations, including the Müttergenesungswerk. She is patron of the Marianne von Weizsäcker Stiftung Integrationshilfe für ehemals Suchtkranke e. V., an organisation for the assistance of recovering addicts which she founded in 1989.

Honours

Foreign honours
 :
 Honorary Recipient of the Order of the Crown of the Realm (1987)
 :
 Grand Cross of the Order of St. Olav (1986)

References

External links 

 
 Weizsäcker-Stiftung

1932 births
Spouses of presidents of Germany
German baronesses
People from Essen
Living people
Richard von Weizsäcker
Marianne